Sri Sri Sri Maryada Ramanna is a 1967 Telugu-language film produced by actor Padmanabham and directed by K. Hemambharadhara Rao. The film stars Padmanabham in the title role along with Geetanjali, Mukkamala, Rajanala, Prabhakar Reddy, Raja Babu in supporting roles. Krishna, Sobhan Babu, and Haranath made guest appearances in a song with Rajasree. The film was successful at the box office.

The film marked the playback singing debut of S. P. Balasubrahmanyam with the song "Emiyee Vinta Moham!" composed by his mentor S. P. Kodandapani.

Plot
A shepherd boy Rami (Padmanabham) becomes Ramanna with the blessings of a sage. The Minister and the Army Commander of the kingdom torture the people for more tax money. Ramanna informs this to the King, and the King offers him to take the throne for three months and solve the problems. Ramanna takes the challenge and succeeds in that and also wins the heart of the princess in this process.

Cast
 Padmanabham as Maryada Ramanna
Geetanjali as Madhuri
Mukkamala as Vichitra Sena
Rajanala
Prabhakar Reddy
Perumallu
Raja Babu as Sukumarudu
Potti Prasad as Viddooram
Haranath
Sobhan Babu
Krishna
Ramakrishna
Rajasree
Balakrishna as Thippanna

Songs
All lyrics are written by Veeturi.
 "Harihari Naaraayano Aadi Naaraayano Karuninchi Mammelu Kamalalochanuda!"
Playback: TM Soundara Rajan
 "Sreekarudu Harudu" (Verse)
Playback: K. Raghuramayya
 "Emiyee Vinta Moham!"
Playback: P. Susheela, S. P. Balasubrahmanyam (debut), K. Raghuramayya, P. B. Sreenivas
 "Mangideelu Mangideelu O Poolabhaamaa!"
Playback: Pithapuram Nageswara Rao, P. Susheela
 "Neeve Neevd Naa Daivamu, Neeve Naa Bhagyamu"
Playback: P. Susheela
 "Vennelagaa Undi"
Playback: K. J. Yesudas, P. Susheela

Trivia 
 S. P. Balasubrahmanyam, noted singer debuted in this film under the guidance of S. P. Kodandapani. As a token of respect, he named his film production company as "Sri Kodandapani Film Circuits".

References

External links
 

1967 films
1960s Telugu-language films
Indian black-and-white films